Pseudaulacaspis cockerelli, known generally as false oleander scale, is a species of armored scale insect in the family Diaspididae. Other common names include the fullaway oleander scale, magnolia white scale, mango scale, oleander scale, and oyster scale. It is found in Europe.

References

Articles created by Qbugbot
Insects described in 1897
Diaspididae